Ashville Historic District is a national historic district located near Marshall, Fauquier County, Virginia.  It encompasses 16 contributing buildings and 1 contributing site in the Reconstruction-era African-American rural village of Ashville.  The district contains nine properties, including the Gothic Revival style Ashville Baptist Church (1899), Ashville School (1910s), Ashville Community Cemetery, and a concentration of historic dwellings and related outbuildings.

It was listed on the National Register of Historic Places in 2004.

References

Historic districts in Fauquier County, Virginia
Gothic Revival architecture in Virginia
National Register of Historic Places in Fauquier County, Virginia
Historic districts on the National Register of Historic Places in Virginia